Dale Township is one of eleven townships in Atchison County, Missouri, United States. As of the 2010 census, its population was 231.

Dale Township most likely was named for the dales within its borders.

Geography
It contains one cemetery, Walkup grove.

The streams of Hickory Branch and Long Branch run through this township.

Transportation
Dale Township contains one airport, Cleveland Airport.

References

 USGS Geographic Names Information System (GNIS)

External links
 US-Counties.com
 City-Data.com

Townships in Atchison County, Missouri
Townships in Missouri